Aung Kyaw Naing (born 20 December 1994) is a Burmese professional footballer. He currently plays for Thai League 2 club Ranong United.

Club career
Aung started his career with Nay Pyi Taw FC. While playing for the club, he won the 2013 MFF Young Player of the Year award.

Balestier Khalsa
Aung moved to S.League side Balestier Khalsa in February 2017 from Nay Pyi Taw alongside his fellow countrymen, Nanda Lin Kyaw Chit and Kyaw Zayar Win, completing the Tigers' foreign signing slots.

He scored his first goal for the club in a league game against the Young Lions, after missing a penalty in the first half, winning the club's first win and points of the season.

International career 
Aung was part of the Myanmar U-23 team that won the silver medal in the 2015 Southeast Asian Games.

He has 2 caps for the Myanmar national football team in 2 friendly matches, scoring no goal.

Honours

International
2015 SEA Games Football: Silver

Individual
MFF Young Player of the Year: 2013

References

External links

1994 births
Living people
Burmese footballers
Myanmar international footballers
Ayeyawady United F.C. players
Balestier Khalsa FC players
Association football midfielders
Southeast Asian Games silver medalists for Myanmar
Southeast Asian Games medalists in football
Competitors at the 2015 Southeast Asian Games